Joaquim José da Silva Xavier (12 November 1746 – 21 April 1792), known as Tiradentes, was a leading member of the colonial Brazilian revolutionary movement known as Inconfidência Mineira, whose aim was full independence from Portuguese colonial rule and creation of a republic. When the separatists' plot was uncovered by authorities, Tiradentes was arrested, tried and publicly hanged.

Since the advent of the Brazilian Republic, Tiradentes has been considered a national hero of Brazil and patron of the Military Police.

Early 

Tiradentes was born on the Fazenda do Pombal, near the village of Santa Rita do Rio Abaixo, at the time disputed territory between the towns of São João del-Rei and Tiradentes, in the Captaincy of Minas Gerais.

Joaquim José da Silva Xavier was the fourth of seven children of Portuguese-born Domingos da Silva Santos and of Brazilian-born Antônia da Encarnação Xavier.

According to his mother's 1757 inventory, there were 35 slaves on the family's large fazenda of Pombal, where they also worked as miners. A porch provided external access to an oratory, and there were slave quarters and communal kitchens. A large and valuable quantity of mining equipment was also listed in the inventory.

In 1755 after the death of his mother, he went with his father and brothers to the town of São José. Two years later, when he was 11 years old, his father died. With the premature death of his parents, his family soon lost its property due to debt. Having received no regular education, he entered under the tutelage of his uncle and godfather Sebastião Ferreira Leitão, who was a dentist. He worked as a peddler and a miner, and he became a partner in a pharmacy in Vila Rica. He dedicated himself to pharmaceutical practices and dentistry, which earned him the nickname Tiradentes. "Tiradentes" means "tooth puller", a pejorative denomination adopted during the trial against him. According to Brother Raimundo de Penaforte, Tiradentes "adorned his mouth with new teeth which he made himself that seemed natural". He also occasionally worked as a doctor in light of knowledge about medicinal plants acquired with his cousin, Brother José Mariano da Conceição Veloso, a celebrated botanist of the time.

Political ideas

Tiradentes used knowledge he acquired about minerals while working as a miner to enter the public service as a terrain surveyor.

He later joined the Minas Gerais Dragoon Regiment, where he was given command of a detachment and sent on missions to cities along "Caminho Novo", a road between Vila Rica (then capital of Minas Gerais) and Rio de Janeiro through which gold was sent to the coast, ultimately to be shipped to Portugal.

Over time, witnessing the transit of goods along Caminho Novo, Tiradentes started to perceive the massive exportation of gold and other valuable resources to the metropolis as exploitation to which Brazilians were subjected. He also grew dissatisfied with his relatively low rank (not a member of the local aristocracy, he was systematically overlooked for promotion and never rose above alferes, the lowest officer rank at the time) and a later dismissal from his commanding post.

His trips to Rio put him in contact with people who had lived in Europe and brought liberal ideas from there.

In 1788, Tiradentes met José Alvares Maciel, a son of Vila Rica's army's commandant who had just returned from England. Contrasting British industrial progress with Brazilian colonial poverty, the two decided to create a group of freedom aspirants. Led by clerics and other Brazilians with some social presence, like Cláudio Manuel da Costa, Tomás Antônio Gonzaga (both public servants and renowned writers) and Alvarenga Peixoto (eminent businessman), the group propagated their ideas among the people.

At the time, Portugal's demand for gold was high. However, productivity of Brazilian mines was declining. The colony was failing to meet the quinto – the quota of gold demanded by the Crown – and pressure from the metropolis rose. This culminated in the creation of the derrama, a heavily confiscatory tribute that, in turn, further stirred seditious sentiments.

Influenced by the writings of Jean-Jacques Rousseau and the American Revolution, Tiradentes joined a number of like-minded citizens in the Inconfidência Mineira, a revolutionary movement. They envisioned an independent Brazilian republic, with São João del Rei as its capital and the conversion of Vila Rica to a university town. The proposed flag for the new republic had a green triangle over a white background, surrounded by the Latin motto "Libertas Quae Sera Tamen" ("Freedom, Even If It Be Late").

[[Image:Bandeira de Minas Gerais.svg|200px|thumb|The inconfidentes''' flag later became the state flag of Minas Gerais, the only modification being the color of the triangle, changed to red.]]

Discovery, trial and execution

Tiradentes's plan was to take to the streets of Vila Rica and proclaim a Brazilian Republic on the day of the derrama, in February 1789, when tax was due to Portugal and the sentiment of revolt among Brazilians would be stronger. Joaquim Silvério dos Reis, one of the conspirators, exposed the plot in exchange for a tax waiver. The governor of Minas Gerais cancelled the derrama and ordered the imprisonment of the rebels.

A trial was carried, lasting almost three years. Tiradentes was sentenced to death, along with ten other inconfidentes. Queen Maria I of Portugal later commuted the sentences of capital punishment to perpetual banishment for all convicts, except those whose activities involved aggravated circumstances. Such was the case of Tiradentes, who took full responsibility for the movement.

He was imprisoned in Rio, then hanged on 21 April 1792. Afterwards, his body was quartered and the pieces were sent to Vila Rica, to be displayed in places where he used to propagate his liberal ideas. His head landed in Ouro Preto but was subsequently lost.

National hero
Tiradentes began to be considered a national hero by the republicans in the late 19th century. After the institution of the Republic, in 1889, the anniversary of his death became a national holiday.

His moniker, "Tiradentes", became the namesake of a city in the state of Minas Gerais, of city squares in Belo Horizonte, Curitiba, São Paulo, Rio de Janeiro, and Ouro Preto, as well as of a major avenue in Santo Domingo, Dominican Republic.

The 11th Mountain Infantry Battalion, "Tiradentes" Regiment (11º Batalhão de Infantaria de Montanha, Regimento "Tiradentes"''), named after the hero, is currently operational in the Brazilian Army.

See also
 Zica family, descendants of Tiradentes
 Toussaint Louverture
 Simón Bolívar
 George Washington

References

Further reading

External links

 Museu da Inconfidência 
 Tiradentes  at about.com
 Tiradentes at e-Biografias

1746 births
1792 deaths
Brazilian people of Portuguese descent
18th-century Brazilian people
People from Minas Gerais
Executed Brazilian people
Executed revolutionaries
Brazilian dentists
People executed by Colonial Brazil
People executed by Brazil by hanging
People executed by Portugal by hanging
Brazilian slave owners
18th-century executions by Portugal